Dharma Bhakta Mathema (1909—1941) was a professional body builder as well as a founding member of Praja Parishad. He introduced modern body building techniques in Nepal, but had gained popularity for his contribution to the Nepalese struggle for freedom against the autocracy of the Rana dynasty. He was killed during the freedom movement, and he is duly recognized as one of the four martyrs of Nepal of the Rana era.

Early life
Dharma Bhakta Mathema was born of a Newar family in Kathmandu in 24 September 1909 (9 Ashoj 1966 BS). His father Adi Bhakta Mathema held a government office as a Subba during the Rana rule. He often went to India to purchase things for the Ranas. He met learned men in India and understood the importance of education. He received his basic education in Sanatan Madhyamik Vidhyalaya in Darjeeling, after which he went to the Scottish Church College in Calcutta to get an Intermediate in Arts (I.A.) degree.

Bodybuilding

Dharma Bhakta's physical appearance was described as thin, unhealthy and weak during his childhood, which caused other children to tease and bully him. This harassment motivated his body-building journey, as he joined a gym while in Calcutta. Constant physical exercise rapidly improved his health. He so excelled in bodybuilding that he was announced as "Shree Bengal" (which literally means "Mr. Bengal") in an all Bengal bodybuilding contest.

After graduating with an I.A. degree from Scottish Church College, he married Uttara Devi from Biratnagar. He returned to Kathmandu and established a gym at his aunt Yamkumari Ray's house. Many youths of Kathmandu were attracted by the novelty of the gym. The gym attracted not only the commoners but also the Rana family and the police forces too. Once a troop of German soldiers had come to Nepal for a visit. He showed his body building tricks and exercises to them in the presence of Juddha Shumsher. 

Once during the Ghode Jatra festival, he showed his bodybuilding prowess to the people in the presence of King Tribhuvan and the Rana family in Tundikhel. He made different bodybuilding poses and performed many test of strength. An instance of such, was when he put a long rod on his back and told three to four persons on each side of the rod to hang. He was then jumping and lifting with those people. In another instance, he lied down on the ground and told a person to hammer his chest with a hammer. People were amazed that he was unharmed. People could not believe that a man could be so strong. King Tribhuvan was also greatly impressed by his feat, so much so such that he was appointed as his physical instructor.

Political activity
Besides bodybuilding, he was actively interested in politics. At that time the struggle for the independence from the British Raj was gaining momentum in India. While in India Dharma Bhakta had met Chittaranjan Das and had joined in the struggle for Indian independence. He wanted to establish a political party and settle in India itself. But for some reason he dropped that plan and returned to Kathmandu with an ardent desire for freedom from the Rana regime. Tyranny, debauchery, economic exploitation and religious persecution characterized Rana rule.

In those days, Juddha Shamsher was the prime minister of Nepal, who ruled with an iron fist. All political parties were banned. Dharma Bhakta met Dashrath Chand in Kathmandu in 1990 BS and in 1936 AD, a political party Praja Parishad was founded in the house of Dharma Bhakta. The founders were Tanka Prasad Acharya, Jiwan Raj Sharma, Ramhari Sharma, Dharma Bhakta and Dashrath Chand. His connection with King Tribhuwan as a physical instructor allowed him to act as a go-between the king and the Praja Parishad. He conveyed every activity of the Praja parishad to the King. However discovery of his political activities prompted Juddha Shamsher to exile his father Adi Bhakta Mathema.

Death
One day, a secret meeting of Praja Parishad was held in Lainchaur which was also attended by King Tribhuwan. The information of this meeting reached Juddha Shamsher, which led to the arrest of many of the members of Praja Parishad including, Dharma Bhakta were arrested. Since three of the founding members of Praja Parishad were of Brahmin caste, and hence were exempt from death penalty, they were duly humiliated and exiled. As for Dashrath Chand and Dharma Bhakta, their caste could not provide a shield against the ruthlessness of a tyrant. Both of them were given death penalty. On 24 January 1941 (12 Magh 1997 BS), Dharma Bhakta was hanged till death at Sifal, Kathmandu, at midnight.

Legacy 
His statue is erected, along with other three martyrs, in the Martyr's Gate (Shahid Gate) memorial in Kathmandu.  Shahid Dharma Bhakta School (SDB), a school was established on his name in Nakkhu, Lalitpur, Nepal by his daughter Renu Devi.

One of the major country-level bodybuilding competition in Nepal is named after Mathema as Dharmashree Nationwide Bodybuilding Championship.

Gallery

See also
Dashrath Chand
Gangalal Shrestha
Shukraraj Shastri
Nepal Praja Parishad

References 

Executed Nepalese people
People executed by Nepal by hanging
1941 deaths
Nepalese rebels
Newar people
People from Kathmandu
Nepalese bodybuilders
Sportspeople from Kathmandu
Nepalese martyrs
Nepal Praja Parishad politicians
Scottish Church College alumni
1909 births